Ottmar Ostermayr (24 October 1886 – 15 December 1958) was a German film producer. He was the brother of Franz Osten and Peter Ostermayr. From 1911 until 1914 he worked for Vienna subsidiary of the French company Eclair. In the 1920s he set up a production company with the film pioneer Oskar Messter. He was later employed at the Munich-based Bavaria Film which had been set up by his brother Peter.

Selected filmography 
 The Fountain of Madness (1921)
 Volga Volga (1928)
 Napoleon at Saint Helena (1929)
 His Daughter is Called Peter (1936)
The Secret Lie (1938)
 The Eternal Spring (1940)
 Venus on Trial (1941)
 Regimental Music (1950)
 The Cloister of Martins (1951)
 The Crucifix Carver of Ammergau (1952)
 Marriage Strike (1953)
 Hubertus Castle (1954)
 The Vulture Wally (1956)

References

Bibliography 
 Bock, Hans-Michael & Bergfelder, Tim. The Concise CineGraph. Encyclopedia of German Cinema. Berghahn Books, 2009.

External links 
 

1886 births
1958 deaths
German film producers
Film people from Munich